The Gemini Awards for Best Children's or Youth Program or Series was presented by the Gemini Awards to honour English children's television programming produced in Canada.

Prior to 1998, a single award was presented for children's programming, regardless of age bracket and inclusive of both fiction and non-fiction programming. In that year, a new award was created for Best Pre-School Program or Series, separating programming for toddlers and young children from programming for older children and teenagers. In 2002, the award was split into separate awards for Best Fiction Program or Series and Best Non-Fiction Program or Series, and the single award was no longer presented.

Winners and Nominees 
Winners in bold.

Best Children's Program

1980s 
1986
 The Kids of Degrassi Street: "Griff Gets a Hand" (CBC)
 A Whole New Ball Game
1987
 Down at Fraggle Rock: Behind the Scenes (CBC)
 Stone Fox (NBC)
 The Conserving Kingdom (TVOntario)
1988
  They Look A Lot Like Us: A China Odyssey (CBC)

Best Children's Series

1980s 
1986
 Fraggle Rock (CBC)
 OWL/TV (CBC)
 Today's Special (TVOntario) 
 Wonderstruck (CBC) 
1987
 Degrassi Junior High (CBC)
 Fraggle Rock (CBC)
 Spirit Bay (CBC and TVOntario)
 What's New (CBC)
1988
 Ramona (CBC)
 Mr. Dressup (CBC)
 Today's Special (TVOntario) 
 What's New (CBC)
 Wonderstruck (CBC)

Best Children's Program or Series

1980s 
1989
 Mr. Dressup (CBC)
 Bob Schneider & The Rainbow Kids in concert
 Happy Castle (Global)

1990s 
1990
 Raffi in Concert with the Rise and Shine Band (CBC)
 Dear Aunt Agnes (TVOntario)
 Fred Penner's Place (CBC)
 Under the Umbrella Tree (CBC)
1992
 The Garden (CTV)
 Join In! (TVOntario)
 Take Off (The Family Channel)
1993
 Shining Time Station (PBS)
 Alligator Pie (CBC)
 Curse of the Viking Grave (Disney Channel)
 OWL/TV (CBC)
1994
 Lamb Chop's Play-Along (YTV)
 Join In! (TVOntario)
 The Big Comfy Couch (YTV)
 Under the Umbrella Tree Special (CBC)
1995
 The Big Comfy Couch (YTV)
 Candles, Snow & Mistletoe (CBC)
 Fred Penner's Place (CBC)
 The Biggest Little Ticket (CTV)
 Wild Side Show (Nickelodeon)
1996
 Are You Afraid of the Dark? (YTV)
 Jim Henson's Dog City (Global)
 Mighty Machines (TVOntario)
 The Adventures of Dudley the Dragon (TVOntario)
 The Composer's Specials (HBO)
 Theodore Tugboat (CBC)
1997
 The Adventures of Dudley the Dragon (TVOntario)
 Goosebumps (YTV)
 Groundling Marsh (YTV)
 On My Mind (TVOntario)
 Shining Time Station ("Second Chances") (PBS)

Best Youth Program or Series

1980s 
1989
 Wonderstruck (CBC)
 Skin
 What's New (CBC)
 YTV Hits (YTV)

1990s 
1990
 Talkin' About AIDS
 The Party's Over
 YTV Rocks (YTV)
1992
 Lost in the Barrens (Disney Channel)
 Diary of a Teenage Smoker (CBC)
 The NewMusic ("Rock 'n' Roll 'n' Reading") (CityTV)
 Too Close...For Comfort
1993
 The Jellybean Odyssey (CBC)
 Degrassi Talks (CBC)
 Road Movies (CBC)
 Wonderstruck (CBC)
1994
 Street Cents (CBC)
 Are You Afraid of the Dark? (YTV)
 Minoru: Memory of Exile
 Spirit Rider (CBC)
 The Odyssey (CBC) 
1995
 Street Cents (CBC)
 AIDScare/AIDsCare (CBC)
 Brainstorm (TVOntario)
 For Angela
 Ready or Not (Global)
1996
 Ready or Not (Global)
 Girl Talk
 Madison (Global)
 What: Body Part Art (TVOntario)
 YTV News (YTV)
1997
 The Composer's Specials ("Handel's Last Chance") (HBO)
 Are You Afraid of the Dark? (YTV)
 Heck's Way Home (CTV)
 Inquiring Minds (TVOntario)
 Madison (Global)

Best Children's or Youth Program or Series

1990s 
1998 - A
 Street Cents (CBC)
 Goosebumps (YTV)
 Ready or Not (Global)
 ReBoot (YTV)
 The Adventures of Shirley Holmes (YTV)
1998 - B
 Ready or Not (Global)
 Incredible Story Studio (YTV)
 Popular Mechanics For Kids (SYN)
 Straight Up (CBC)
 Street Cents (CBC)
 The Adventures of Shirley Holmes (YTV)
1999
 Goosebumps (YTV)
 Incredible Story Studio (YTV)
 Jenny and the Queen of Light (Global)
 The Inventors' Specials ("Edison:The Wizard of Light") (HBO)
 YAA! To The M@x (CBC)

2000s 
2000
 Incredible Story Studio (YTV)
 Popular Mechanics For Kids (SYN)
 Street Cents (CBC)
 The Worst Witch (YTV)
 YAA! To The M@x (CBC)
2001
 Street Cents (CBC)
 Caitlin's Way (YTV)
 I Was A Sixth Grade Alien (YTV)
 Incredible Story Studio (YTV)
 Screech Owls (YTV)

See also

 Canadian television awards

References 

Children's Program